William Edwin Melton (born July 7, 1945), nicknamed "Beltin' Bill" and "Beltin' Melton", is an American former professional baseball player and television sports commentator. He played as a third baseman in Major League Baseball from  through , most prominently as a member of the Chicago White Sox where he was the 1971 American League home run champion and named to the 1971 American League All-Star team. He also played for the California Angels and Cleveland Indians. He was a commentator for NBC Sports Chicago White Sox broadcasts.

Baseball career
Melton was signed as a minor league free agent directly out of high school prior to the 1964 season and was assigned to the White Sox rookie league Sarasota White Sox. After spending 1965 back at Sarasota, this time with the A-League Sarasota Sun Sox, Melton made steady progress through the White Sox system, playing for the A-League Fox Cities Foxes, AA Evansville White Sox, and AAA Hawaii Islanders (and Syracuse Chiefs while on loan to the Yankees organization). At each level, he displayed the two characteristics that he would be known for throughout his playing career: a powerful bat and questionable fielding.

Melton made his major league debut on May 4, 1968, and was a mainstay at third for the White Sox for the next seven years. After leading the Sox in home runs in 1969 with 23, Melton came into his own in 1970, hitting 33 home runs and again leading the team. In 1971, Melton had arguably his best season as he made the all-star team and led the American League with 33 home runs – the first time a White Sox player had led the league in home runs. Melton's production declined in 1972 after he missed most of the season with two herniated discs resulting from trying to break his son's fall from their garage roof. The injury sapped his power such that he would not again hit more than 21 home runs in a year. Before his back problems, Melton was a popular player, but when his play began to suffer due to his back injury, he became the target of fans and media. Melton especially drew the ire of White Sox broadcaster Harry Caray, who often railed against Beltin' Bill for his fielding problems. Never good with the glove, finishing either third or fourth in the league for errors by a third baseman every year except his rookie and injury-shortened 1972 seasons, Melton led the league with 24 errors in 1974 and 26 in 1975.

He was traded along with Steve Dunning from the White Sox to the Angels for Jim Spencer and Morris Nettles on December 11, 1975. Expected to become the new designated hitter, Melton was the second right-handed power batter along with Bobby Bonds to have been obtained by the Angels that day. His production continued to decrease as he hit .208 with 6 home runs in 118 games and he clashed with the manager Dick Williams. Following the 1976 season, he was traded again, this time to the Indians for a player to be named later (ultimately relief pitcher Stan Perzanowski) and cash. After appearing in only 50 games for the Indians in 1977, hitting only .241 with no home runs, he retired following the season.

Career statistics
In 1144 games over 10 seasons, Melton compiled a .253 batting average (1004-for-3971) with 496 runs, 162 doubles, 9 triples, 160 home runs, 591 RBI, 479 base on balls, 669 strikeouts, .337 on-base percentage and .419 slugging percentage. Defensively, he recorded a .956 fielding percentage at third base, first base and right field.

Post-career
After working with his father manufacturing skateboard wheels and becoming a real estate agent following retirement, Melton took a position as a community relations representative for the White Sox 1992. In 1998, Melton was hired by WGN to be a White Sox pre- and postgame television analyst. In 2005, he was hired by Comcast SportsNet Chicago in a similar position.

Until 1987, Melton was the White Sox' all-time home run leader. He was passed in 1987 by Harold Baines, who was then overtaken by Carlton Fisk in 1990. Fisk was later bypassed by Frank Thomas. He is currently eighth on the White Sox all-time home runs list and tenth on the team's all-time strikeouts list.

See also
 List of Major League Baseball annual home run leaders

References

External links
, or Retrosheet, or Pura Pelota

1945 births
Living people
Águilas del Zulia players
American League All-Stars
American League home run champions
Baseball players from Mississippi
California Angels players
Chicago White Sox announcers
Chicago White Sox players
Citrus Owls baseball players
Citrus Owls football players
Cleveland Indians players
Evansville White Sox players
Florida Instructional League White Sox players
Fox Cities Foxes players
Hawaii Islanders players
Major League Baseball third basemen
Sportspeople from Gulfport, Mississippi
Sarasota Sun Sox players
Sarasota White Sox players
Syracuse Chiefs players